Blackfire may refer to:

Comics and literature
Blackfire, an erotic magazine published by the BLK organization
Blackfire (DC Comics), a comic book supervillainess
Deacon Blackfire, a DC comic book supervillain

Music
Blackfire (American band), a punk rock group 
Blackfire (Australian band), an Indigenous Australian rock band

Other uses
 Black fire, alternatively titled Blackfire, 1972 Australian short film by Bruce McGuinness
Blackfire Exploration, a Canadian mining corporation
 Blackfire Profiler, a software performance analysis tool

See also
Black Fire (disambiguation)